Gunsight Butte is a 4,678-foot (1,426 meter) elevation sandstone summit located in Glen Canyon National Recreation Area, in Kane County of southern Utah. Gunsight Butte is an island that towers nearly 1,000 feet above Lake Powell when the lake is full. This iconic landmark of the Lake Powell area is a butte composed primarily of Entrada Sandstone, similar to Padres Butte  to the east-southeast, and Dominguez Butte  to the southeast. The Entrada Sandstone of Gunsight Butte is overlain by Romana Sandstone, and capped by Morrison Formation. The Entrada Sandstone, which was originally deposited as sandy mud on a tidal flat, is believed to have formed about 160 million years ago during the Jurassic period as a giant sand sea, the largest in Earth's history. According to the Köppen climate classification system, Gunsight Butte is located in an arid climate zone with hot, very dry summers, and chilly winters with very little snow.

See also
 Colorado Plateau
 List of rock formations in the United States

Gallery

References

External links
 Weather forecast: National Weather Service
 Gunsight Butte prior to Lake Powell: Aerial photo
 Photo of east aspect by Barry Goldwater

Colorado Plateau
Landforms of Kane County, Utah
Glen Canyon National Recreation Area
Lake Powell
Buttes of Utah
North American 1000 m summits
Sandstone formations of the United States